Kasko is a 2009 Telugu romantic drama film directed by G. Nageswara Reddy. The film stars Vaibhav Reddy and Shweta Basu Prasad in the lead roles.

Cast 

 Vaibhav Reddy as Vamsi / Pawan Kalyan
 Shweta Basu Prasad as RJ Krishnaveni
 Pradeep Rawat as Basavanna
 Brahmanandam as Mahesh Babu
 Salim Panda as Alauddin
 Gowri Pandit as Deepika
 Jayaprakash Reddy as J.P. (a goon)
 Chalapathi Rao as Vamsi's father
 Satyam Rajesh as Salim, Vamsi's friend
 Vajja Venkata Giridhar as Vamsi's friend
 Srinivasa Reddy as Vamsi's friend
 M. S. Narayana
 Raghu Babu
Tarjan
Azad

Production 
A. Kodandarami Reddy, who produced Vaibhav Reddy's previous Telugu venture Godava, is also producing this film. Shweta Basu Prasad was signed as the heroine while Brahmanandam was signed as a comedian. Tamil music director Premji Amaren, who was Vaibhav Reddy's childhood friend and acted with him in Saroja, signed this film, which marks his debut in Telugu cinema. In January 2009, the production team shot the film in BHEL, Hyderabad. Kodandarami Reddy hired a helicopter to shoot the heroine kidnapping scene.

Soundtrack 
The audio launch was held on 18 November 2009. The guests of the function included Paruchuri Gopala Krishna, V. V. Vinayak, B. Gopal, and N. Shankar.

Release 
The film was scheduled to release on 4 December, but was postponed.

The Full Hyderabad gave the film a negative review saying that "All said and done, Kasko won't test your patience – they'll heave it out of the theatres pretty soon". 123 Telugu called the film a "head ache which is cliched, predictable and probably pointless drama too".

References

External links

Indian romantic comedy-drama films
2000s Telugu-language films
2009 romantic comedy-drama films
2009 films
Films directed by G. Nageswara Reddy
2009 comedy films
2009 drama films
Films scored by Premgi Amaren